Kiddushin may refer to:

 Erusin or Kiddushin, sanctification or dedication, also called erusin (betrothal), the first of the two stages of the Jewish wedding process.
 Kiddushin (Talmud), the last tractate of the third order of the Mishnah Nashim.